is a city located in Kyoto Prefecture, Japan. , the city had an estimated population of 16,988 in 8348 households and a population density of 98 persons per km².

Geography
Miyazu is located in the northern part of Kyoto Prefecture at the base of the Tango Peninsula, facing Wakasa Bay of the Sea of Japan to the east. Located in Miyazu City is Amanohashidate or the "bridge to heaven", said to be one of Japan's three most beautiful sights.

Neighboring municipalities
Kyoto Prefecture
Kyōtango
Maizuru
Fukuchiyama
Yosano
Ine

Climate
Miyazu has a humid subtropical climate (Köppen Cfa), featuring a marked seasonal variation in temperature and precipitation. Summers are hot and humid, but winters are relatively cold with occasional snowfall.

Demographics
Per Japanese census data, the population of Miyazu in 2020 is 16,758 people. Miyazu has been conducting censuses since 1920. The city's population peaked in 1945 and has declined gradually in the decades since. It is now less than half what it was post-World War II.

History
The area of present-day Miyazu was part of ancient Tango Province, and was then location of the provincial capital and the Tango Kokubun-ji during the late Nara and Heian period. The area came under the control of the Isshiki clan during the Muromachi period and  then to Hosokawa Tadaoki in the Sengoku period. During the Edo Period, it was largely under 70,000 koku Miyazu Domain under the Tokugawa shogunate and ruled by a cadet branch of the Matsudaira clan from Miyazu Castle. After the Meiji restoration, the town of Miyazu was established within Yosa District with the creation of the modern municipalities system on April 1, 1889. Miyazu became a port for trading with the United States and the United Kingdom in July 1899. On June 1, 1954, Miyazu merged with the neighboring villages of Kunda, Yoshizu, Fuchu, Hioki, Seya, Yoro, and Higatani to form the city of Miyazu. The village of Yura was annexed on September 20, 1956,

Government
Miyazu has a mayor-council form of government with a directly elected mayor and a unicameral city council of 14 members. Miyazu, together with the town of Yosano contributes one member to the Kyoto Prefectural Assembly. In terms of national politics, the city is part of Kyoto 5th district of the lower house of the Diet of Japan.

Economy
Miyazu has an economy based on agriculture, regional commerce, and seasonal tourism.

Education
Miyazu has six public elementary schools and three public middle schools operated by the town government and two public high schools operated by the Kyoto Prefectural Department of Education. There is also one private high school.

Transportation

Railways
 Kyoto Tango Railway – Miyazu Line
  -  -  -  -  
 Kyoto Tango Railway – Miyafuku Line
  -  -  -

Highways
Kyoto Jūkan Expressway：（Maizuru）- Miyazu-Amanohashidate IC
San'in Kinki Expressway：Yoza-Amanohashidate IC -（Yosano）

Seaport
Port of Miyazu

International relations

Twin towns – sister cities

Local attractions
Ama-no-Hashidate（one of the Three Views of Japan）
Catholic Miyazu Church
Kono Shrine（Ichinomiya of Tango Province）
Seikiro Ryokan（Japan Heritage・No43.Tango Chirimen Textile Road）
Tango Kokubun-ji, National Historic Site

Festival＆Events

Miyazu matsuri

References

External links

 Miyazu City official website in Japanese
 Japan guide information on Amanohashidate in English

Cities in Kyoto Prefecture
Miyazu, Kyoto
Populated coastal places in Japan